Simone may refer to:
 Simone (given name), a feminine (or Italian masculine) given name of Hebrew origin
 Simone (surname), an Italian surname

Simone may also refer to:
 Simone (1918 film), a French silent drama film
 Simone (1926 film), a French silent drama film 
 Simone (2002 film), a science-fiction drama film
 Simone (actress) (born 1962), stage name of Lisa Celeste Stroud, daughter of Nina Simone
 Nina Simone (1933–2003), stage name of Eunice Kathleen Waymon,  singer, songwriter, musician, arranger, and civil rights activist
 Simone (born 1966), Egyptian singer and actress
 Simone (character), a fictional character in the ABC Family show The Nine Lives of Chloe King
 Simone Bittencourt de Oliveira (born 1949), Brazilian singer and performer, better known by her mononym Simone
 Simone Egeriis (born 1992), Danish singer, better known by her mononym Simone
 Tropical Storm Simone (disambiguation), two tropical cyclones in the Eastern Pacific Ocean
 1961's Tropical Storm Simone – a continuation of Atlantic Hurricane Hattie
 Tropical Storm Simone  (1968)
"Simone", a song by Goldfrapp from Tales of Us

See also
 Simon (disambiguation)